John Timbs (17 August 1801 – 6 March 1875) was an English author and antiquary. Some of his work was published under the pseudonym of Horace Welby.

Biography
Timbs was born in 1801 in Clerkenwell, London. He was educated at a private school at Hemel Hempstead. In his sixteenth year he was apprenticed to a druggist and printer at Dorking. He had early shown literary capacity, and when nineteen began to write for the Monthly Magazine. A year later he became secretary to Sir Richard Phillips, its proprietor, and permanently adopted literature as a profession.

He was successively editor of the Mirror of Literature, the Harlequin, The Literary World, and sub-editor of the Illustrated London News. He was later to become the third editor of the ILN.
He was also founder and first editor of Year-Book of Science and Art. His published works amounted to more than one hundred and fifty volumes. In 1834 he was elected a fellow of the Society of Antiquaries of London.

Timbs died on 6 March 1875 and is buried in the churchyard of St Peter and St Paul, Edenbridge, Kent.

Works 
Some of these were published under the pseudonym, Horace Welby. His work continued to be re-edited and republished well after his death.

Signs before Death, and authenticated apparitions: in one hundred narratives, collected by Horace Welby. 1825
Arcana of Science and Art: or, An annual register of useful inventions and improvements, discoveries and new facts, in mechanics, chemistry, natural history, and social economy; 1828
Curiosities of London; 1828
Harlequin: A journal of the drama. 1829
Laconics; 1829
Literary World: a journal of popular information and entertainment. 1839
Table-Wit, and After-Dinner Anecdote. 1840
Curiosities of London: exhibiting the most rare and remarkable objects of interest in the metropolis; with nearly Fifty Years' Personal Recollections. 1855
Things not generally known, familiarly explained: A book for old and young. 1856
Curiosities of History; 1857
School-Days of Eminent Men. I. Sketches of the progress of education in England, from the reign of King Alfred to that of Queen Victoria. II. Early lives of celebrated British authors, philosophers and poets, inventors and discoverers, divines, heroes, statesmen &c\. 1858
Curiosities of Science, 1859
Things Not Generally Known, Familiarly Explained, 1859
Stories of Inventors and Discoverers in Science and the Useful Arts. 1860
Popular Errors Explained and Illustrated. 1862
Century of Anecdote from 1760 to 1860. 1864
Romance of London. Supernatural stories, sights and shows, strange adventures, and remarkable persons. 1865
Something for Everybody; and a garland for the year. 1866
Club Life of London, 1866
English Eccentrics and Eccentricities. 1866, in two volumes
Mysteries of Life, Death, and Futurity. 1868
Mountain Adventures in the Various Countries of the World. 1869
Wonderful Inventions: from the mariner's compass to the electric telegraph cable. 1870
Abbeys, Castles, and Ancient Halls of England and Wales. 1872
Thoughts for Times and Seasons. 1872
Doctors and Patients. 1873

References

External links
 
 
 
 
 

1801 births
1875 deaths
English antiquarians
19th-century antiquarians
Fellows of the Society of Antiquaries of London
English male journalists
People from Clerkenwell
English magazine editors
19th-century British journalists
19th-century English male writers